Starsem is a French-Russian company that was created in 1996 to commercialise the Soyuz launcher internationally. Starsem is headquartered in Évry, France (near Paris) and has the following shareholders:
 ArianeGroup (35%)
 Arianespace (15%)
 Roscosmos (25%)
 Progress Rocket Space Centre (25%)

References

External links 
 Starsem, the Soyuz company website

Commercial launch service providers
Space industry companies of Russia